Jean Sayegh (born June 28, 1981, in Lebanon) is a male water polo player from Canada. He was a member of the Canada men's national water polo team, that claimed the bronze medal at the 2007 Pan American Games in Rio de Janeiro, Brazil. Sayegh was also part of the Canadian team which placed 11th at the 2008 Olympic Games in Beijing.

Playing as a forward Sayegh was named to the tournament all-star team at the Canadian Championships.

References

1981 births
Living people
Canadian male water polo players
Lebanese emigrants to Canada
Water polo players at the 2008 Summer Olympics
Olympic water polo players of Canada
Université du Québec à Rimouski alumni
Pan American Games bronze medalists for Canada
Pan American Games medalists in water polo
Water polo players at the 2007 Pan American Games
Medalists at the 2007 Pan American Games
Sportspeople of Lebanese descent